Richy Müller (born Hans-Jürgen Müller; 26 September 1955) is a German television and movie actor. He is particularly known as a crime scene investigator in the German television series Tatort.

Filmography
  (1979, TV miniseries)
 Jetzt und alles (1981)
  (Be Gentle, Penguin, 1982)
  (1982)
 Kamikaze 1989 (1982)
  (1982)
 The Noah's Ark Principle (1984)
 Pogo 1104 (1984, TV miniseries)
 The Voice (1989)
  (1990)
 Just a Matter of Duty (1992)
  (1994, TV film)
 One of My Oldest Friends (1995)
 The Superwife (1996)
 Father's Day (1996)
  (1996, TV film)
 The Pharmacist (1997)
  (1999, TV film)
 The State I Am In (2000)
 Rote Glut (2000, TV film)
 Fandango (2000)
 Die Affäre Semmeling (2002, TV miniseries)
 XXX (2002)
 I'll Be Seeing You (2004)
 Alone (2004)
 Farland (2004)
  (2005)
  (2006, TV film)
 Four Minutes (2006)
 The Poll Diaries (2010)
 Vampire Sisters (2012)
  (2013)

Controversy

During the COVID-19 pandemic in April 2021, Richy Müller contributed to and later distanced himself from
the controversial #allesdichtmachen initiative.

References

External links

Players Agency Berlin 
 

1955 births
Living people
German male film actors
German male television actors
20th-century German male actors
21st-century German male actors
Actors from Mannheim
Porsche Supercup drivers
Recipients of the Order of Merit of Baden-Württemberg

Porsche Carrera Cup Germany drivers
German racing drivers
Racing drivers from Baden-Württemberg